Clark Smith (born April 17, 1995) is a former American swimmer who specialized in freestyle and butterfly. He earned an Olympic gold medal at the 2016 Summer Olympics in Rio de Janeiro. He is the son of John and Tori Smith, who both swam at the University of Texas. His father John was an NCAA champion for the Texas Longhorns. His mother Tori represented the US at the 1984 Summer Olympics in Los Angeles.

In May of 2013 as a senior in high school Smith broke the High School National Record (NISCA) in the 100-yard butterfly in a time of 46.42 seconds. 

As a Freshman at the University of Texas, Smith failed to qualify for the 2014 NCAA Championships held in Austin, Texas as the Longhorn Men finished second place in the team standings.

The following year, Smith not only qualified for the meet but won an individual title in the 500-yard freestyle at the 2015 NCAA Championships. Helping the Longhorns win the overall team title. 

At the 2016 US Olympic Trials, Smith qualified for the 4x200 free relay, and earned a gold medal in the event in Rio.

He has simultaneously held the American records in the 500-yard freestyle with a time of 4:08.42, the 1000-yard freestyle with a time of 8:33.93, the 1650-yard freestyle with a time of 14:22.41  and the 800-yard freestyle relay with a time of 6:08.61. 3 of the 4 records were set during the 2017 NCAA Championships his senior year.

References

External links
 
 
 
 
 
 

1995 births
Living people
Swimmers at the 2016 Summer Olympics
Olympic gold medalists for the United States in swimming
Swimmers from Atlanta
Medalists at the 2016 Summer Olympics
World Aquatics Championships medalists in swimming
American male freestyle swimmers
American male butterfly swimmers
20th-century American people
21st-century American people